is a Japanese actor and voice actor. In 2007, he joined Yen Theater Research Institute before he promoted to Drama Group Yen Membership.   He is best known for voicing Saichi Sugimoto in Golden Kamuy and Legoshi in Beastars.

Filmography

Television animation 
2013 
 Gundam Build Fighters, Server
 Gifuu Doudou!!: Kanetsugu to Keiji, Allied soldiers
 Mushibugyō, Yumehisa Sakaki 
 Gingitsune,  Member
2014
 HappinessCharge PreCure!, Chairman Kariyazaki
 Chaika - The Coffin Princess, Soldier
 Mushishi, Father Kaoru 
 Yo-kai Watch, The Couple
2015
 Gundam Reconguista in G, Staff, Pilot
 Gin Tama, Newscaster
2016
 Poco's Udon World, Kiuchi
 The Kindaichi Case Files, Hiiragi Shinichirou
2017
 Granblue Fantasy The Animation, Skyfarer B
 Duel Masters,  Jolly the Johnny, Loud "NYZ" Noisy
2018
 Violet Evergarden, Toby Selwyn 
 Golden Kamuy, Saichi Sugimoto
 Amanchu!, Macho 
 Full Metal Panic! Invisible Victory,  Alastor
 100 Sleeping Princes and the Kingdom of Dreams, Bucks 
 That Time I Got Reincarnated as a Slime, Ranga
2019
 Cop Craft, Assistant Gardner Attorney
 Is It Wrong to Try to Pick Up Girls in a Dungeon?, Ares
 Lupin the Third: Prison of the Past, Balmer's younger brother 
 Beastars,  Legoshi
 Fire Force, The Assault
2020
 Id:Invaded, Haruka Kazuta 
 Ahiru no Sora, Kashiwagi Kazushi
 Sing "Yesterday" for Me, Rikuo Uozumi
 The God of High School,  Commissioner R
 Great Pretender, Clark Ibrahim
 Golden Kamuy Season 3, Saichi Sugimoto
 Sleepy Princess in the Demon Castle, Red Siberian
2021
 Beastars Season 2,  Legoshi
 That Time I Got Reincarnated as a Slime Season 2, Ranga
 Megalobox 2: Nomad, Sakuma
 Joran: The Princess of Snow and Blood, Jin Kuzuhara
 The Slime Diaries: That Time I Got Reincarnated as a Slime, Ranga
 Night Head 2041, Mikie Fujiki
 Scarlet Nexus (2021), Kaito Sumeragi
 Dragon Quest: The Adventure of Dai, Sigma
2022
 Aoashi, Tatsuya Fukuda
 Golden Kamuy Season 4, Saichi Sugimoto
2023
 Malevolent Spirits, Nagi
 Trigun Stampede, Monev the Gale
 Hell's Paradise: Jigokuraku, Yamada Asaemon Shion
 The Legendary Hero Is Dead!, Leland Tallman
 Sacrificial Princess and the King of Beasts, Jormungand

Original video animation (OVA) 
 Mushibugyō (2014), Yumehisa Sakaki 
 Golden Kamuy (2019), Saichi Sugimoto

Original net animation
 Blade of the Immortal -Immortal- (2019), Shinriji
 The Way of the Househusband (2021), Hirono
 JoJo's Bizarre Adventure: Stone Ocean (2021), Lang Rangler
 Thermae Romae Novae (2022), Marcus
 Exception (2022), Lewis

Anime films
 Burn the Witch (2020), Bruno Bangnyfe
 That Time I Got Reincarnated as a Slime the Movie: Scarlet Bond (2022), Ranga
The First Slam Dunk (2022), Yohei Mito

Dubbing

Live-action
1917, Cpl.William Schofield (George MacKay)
47 Ronin, Young Oishi
Absentia, Tommy Gibbs (Angel Bonanni)
The Age of Adaline, Ellis Jones (Michiel Huisman)
American Made, JB (Caleb Landry Jones)
Annie, Simon Goodspeed (Ashton Kutcher)
Batman v Superman: Dawn of Justice, Barry Allen / The Flash (Ezra Miller)
Beauty and the Beast, Jean-Baptiste
The BFG, Mr. Tibbs (Rafe Spall)
Blackway, Nate (Alexander Ludwig)
Blue Story, Marco (Michael Ward)
Bohemian Rhapsody, Bob Geldof (Dermot Murphy)
Carrie, Jackie (Max Topplin)
Child 44, Vasili Nikitin (Joel Kinnaman)
City on a Hill, Anton Campbell (Shannon Wallace)
Cold Comes the Night, Donnie (Leo Fitzpatrick)
Crisis on Earth-X, Winn Schott (Jeremy Jordan)
Debris, Efraim Muñoz
Escape from Mogadishu, Kang Dae-jin (Zo In-sung)
Fantastic Beasts and Where to Find Them, Langdon Shaw (Ronan Raftery)
Fathers and Daughters, Cameron (Aaron Paul)
Flight 7500, Brad Martin (Ryan Kwanten)
The Gallows, Reese Houser (Reese Mishler)
Godzilla: King of the Monsters, Sam Coleman (Thomas Middleditch)
John Wick: Chapter 3 – Parabellum, Earl (Tobias Segal)
Katy Keene, Alexander Cabot (Lucien Laviscount)
Left Behind, Cameron "Buck" Williams (Chad Michael Murray)
Legends of Tomorrow, John Constantine (Matt Ryan)
The Lord of the Rings: The Rings of Power, Elendil (Lloyd Owen)
The Love Punch, Vincent Kruger (Laurent Lafitte)
The Mustang, Henry (Jason Mitchell)
Night at the Museum: Secret of the Tomb, Amir (Patrick Sabongui)
Night of the Living Dead, Tom (Keith Wayne)
Pete's Dragon, Abner
Raised by Wolves, Father (Abubakar Salim)
Sabotage, Agent Spolcheck (Troy Garity)
Snake Eyes, Tommy Arashikage / Storm Shadow (Andrew Koji)
Station Eleven, Frank Chaudhary (Nabhaan Rizwan)
Suicide Squad, Barry Allen / The Flash (Ezra Miller)
Supergirl, Winslow Schott Jr. / Toyman (Jeremy Jordan)
Terminator Genisys, Eric Thompson (Douglas Smith)
Wanted (2019 BS Japan edition), Barry (Chris Pratt)
Wayward Pines, Jason Higgins (Tom Stevens)
We Don't Belong Here, Tomas (Justin Chatwin)

Animation
Frozen II, Ryder

Radio
 Kobayashi talk (2020-)-Anium Radio Station

Video Games
 Cyberpunk 2077 (2020), Male V
 Final Fantasy VII Remake (2020), Butch
 Samurai Warriors 5 (2021), Tadakatsu Honda
 Scarlet Nexus (2021), Kaito Sumeragi
 Zenless Zone Zero (TBD), Von Lycaon
  Granblue Fantasy (2022), Falsch

Stage 
 Two strange people
 Grab the air
 Hansel and Gretel
 Biloxi Blues (2013)

References

External links
Official agency profile 

 Anime and manga portal

1983 births
Living people
Japanese male stage actors
Japanese male video game actors
Japanese male voice actors
Male voice actors from Aichi Prefecture
21st-century Japanese male actors